A number of steamships have been named Varna, including –

 Varna (Варна), a frigate built for the Imperial Russian Navy's Black Sea Fleet in 1829
  (Варна), a ship of the line built for the Imperial Russian Navy's Black Sea Fleet in 1838–1842. 
 , a Norwegian ship that carried the Dutch Polar Expedition of 1882–83
 , a Bulgarian cargo ship sunk in a collision in December 1929
 , a British cargo ship sunk by aerial bombing in February 1941
 , a Bulgarian cargo ship sunk by torpedo in August 1941
 , a Bulgarian cargo ship sunk by torpedo in August 1943
 , a Bulgarian (later Greek) cruise ship in service 1967–77

Ship names